Bill Cosby Presents the Cosnarati: State of Emergency is a studio album by American entertainer Bill Cosby. It was released digitally on October 20, 2009, and in physical form on November 24, 2009 via World Alert Music. Audio production of the project was handled by Cosby's longtime musical colleague William "Spaceman" Patterson and Ultramagnetic MCs' co-founder Cedric "Ced Gee" Miller. It featured guest appearances from rappers Jace the Great, Hahz the Ripper, and Supa Nova Slom.

Track listing

Personnel

William Henry Cosby Jr. - vocals, concept, percussion, keyboards, executive producer
William "Spaceman" Patterson - vocals, guitar, bass, drums, drum programming, keyboards, synthesizer, horns, trumpet, sitar, whistle, arranging, mixing, producer
Cedric Ulmont Miller - vocals, drum programming, keyboards, arranging, mixing, co-producer
Hassan McMillan - vocals, keyboards, arranging
Jamal Ali Gary - vocals
Daoud Torain - vocals
Jeff Jones - vocals, mixing, recording
Norman G. Bullard - vocals, additional engineering
Taharqa Patterson - backing vocals
Preston Vismala - keyboards
Stanton Davis - trumpet
Bob Stewart - tuba
Tony Dawsey - mastering
Alonzo Wright - additional engineering
Erika Ranee - artwork

References

External links
 billcosby.com

2009 albums
Bill Cosby albums
Hip hop albums by American artists
Self-released albums